Koki Kano (加納虹輝, Kanō Kōki, born 19 December 1997) is a Japanese right-handed épée fencer, 2022 individual Asian champion, and 2021 team Olympic champion. 

Along with Masaru Yamada, Kazuyasu Minobe, and Satoru Uyama, Kano was a member of the Japanese team that won gold in the team men's épée event at the 2020 Tokyo Olympic Games. It was Japan's first Olympic gold medal in fencing.

Medal record

Olympic Games

World Championship

Asian Championship

World Cup

References

External links
 

1997 births
Living people
Sportspeople from Aichi Prefecture
Japanese male épée fencers
Fencers at the 2018 Asian Games
Asian Games gold medalists for Japan
Asian Games bronze medalists for Japan
Asian Games medalists in fencing
Medalists at the 2018 Asian Games
Olympic fencers of Japan
Fencers at the 2020 Summer Olympics
Olympic gold medalists for Japan
Medalists at the 2020 Summer Olympics
Olympic medalists in fencing
World Fencing Championships medalists